The 1936 Oglethorpe Stormy Petrels football team was an American football team that represented Oglethorpe University as an independent during the 1936 college football season. In their third year under head coach John W. Patrick, the Stormy Petrels compiled a 4–5 record.

Schedule

References

Oglethorpe
Oglethorpe Stormy Petrels football seasons
Oglethorpe Stormy Petrels football